The Ankavanana is a river located in northern Madagascar in the Sava Region. Its sources are south of Andapa, crosses the Route Nationale 5a near Antalaha and flows into the Indian Ocean.

References 

Rivers of Madagascar
Rivers of Sava Region